Skimmin is a glucoside of umbelliferone.

References 

Coumarins
Phenol glucosides